Ypthima ceylonica, the white fourring, is a species of Satyrinae butterfly found in Sri Lanka and India.

References

ceylonica
Butterflies of Asia
Butterflies of Sri Lanka
Butterflies described in 1865
Taxa named by William Chapman Hewitson